Naina may refer to:

Films and music 
 Naina (1973 film)
 Naina (2002 film)
 Naina (2005 film)
 "Naina" (Arijit Singh song), a song from the 2016 film Dangal

People
 Naina Yeltsina, widow of former Russian President Boris Yeltsin
 Naina Andriantsitohaina, mayor of Antananarivo, Madagascar
 Naina (actress), Bollywood actress in the 1965 film Gumnaam
 Naina Lal Kidwai, Indian banker

Other uses 
 Navi Mumbai Airport Influence Notified Area, Maharashtra, India
 Neyneh, a village in Markazi Province, Iran
 A character in the 1820 poem Ruslan and Ludmila by Alexander Pushkin

See also
 
 Nainar (disambiguation)